The 2000–01 NBA season was the Wizards’ 40th season in the National Basketball Association. Washington D.C. hosted the 2001 NBA All-Star Game. During the off-season, the Wizards acquired Felipe López and Cherokee Parks from the Vancouver Grizzlies, and acquired Popeye Jones from the Denver Nuggets. Under new head coach Leonard Hamilton, and later on trading Parks to the Los Angeles Clippers in exchange for Tyrone Nesby, the Wizards continued to struggle posting a nine-game losing streak between November and December. The team lost nine straight again in January leading to an awful 7–34 start to the season, as Mitch Richmond only played just 37 games due to knee injuries. People scoffed that their best player, and the team's Vice President Michael Jordan was sitting up in the owner's box.

At midseason, Juwan Howard, who grew disgruntled with all the team failures, was traded along with second-year center Calvin Booth to the Dallas Mavericks in exchange for Christian Laettner, Hubert Davis, Loy Vaught and rookies Courtney Alexander and Etan Thomas, who was out for the entire season with a toe injury, while Lopez was released to free agency, and later on signed with the Minnesota Timberwolves. After the trade deadline, Rod Strickland, who was also disgruntled playing for the Wizards, was also released and later on re-signed with his former team, the Portland Trail Blazers.

Alexander averaged 17.0 points per game in the second half of the season with the Wizards, and made the NBA All-Rookie Second Team. However, the Wizards lost nine of their final ten games finishing in last place in the Atlantic Division with a dreadful 19–63 record, their worst to that point over a full 82-game season, although subsequently equalled by the 2008–09 Wizards. Second-year star Richard Hamilton showed improvement and led the team in scoring with 18.1 points per game. Following the season, Richmond signed as a free agent with the Los Angeles Lakers, while Vaught and Michael Smith were both released to free agency, and Leonard Hamilton resigned as head coach after just one year with the Wizards.

Offseason

Draft picks

Roster

Roster Notes
 Rookie power forward Etan Thomas missed the entire season due to a toe injury.

Regular season

Season standings

z - clinched division title
y - clinched division title
x - clinched playoff spot

Record vs. opponents

Game log

Player statistics

NOTE: Please write the players statistics in alphabetical order by last name.

Awards and records
 Courtney Alexander, NBA All-Rookie Team 2nd Team

Transactions

References

See also
 2000-01 NBA season

Washington Wizards seasons
Washington Wizards
Washington Wizards